Desamangalam Ramakrishnan is a Malayalam–language poet, translator, critic and teacher. He was born in 1948 in Desamangalam in Thalapilly taluk, Trichur district. He obtained his M.A. degree in Malayalam from Pattambi Sanskrit College. Subsequently, he joined the Calicut University and researched on Malayalam poetry under K. N. Ezhuthachan. He was awarded a fellowship from the Central Ministry of Culture. He worked as a lecturer at various government colleges from 1975 to 1989. He was a professor of Malayalam literature at the University of Kerala till his retirement in 2008. He then served as Emeritus Fellow of U. G. C. in Calicut University (2009-2011).

Works

Poetry
 Krishnapaksham
 Vittupoya Vakkukal
 Thatha Ramayanam
 Chithal Varum Kaalam
 Kanathaya Kuttikal
 Maravi Ezhuthunnath
 Vicharichathalla
 Ethra Yadruchikam
 Carol
 Badhirathanmar
 Dhanushkodiyile Nizhalukal

Translations
 Derek Walcottinte Kavithakal
 Sthreeloka Kavitha
 Bharatheeya Kavithakal
 Bhavishyathchithrapadam
 Telugu Kavitha

Study
 Kavyabhashayile Prashnangal (Editor)

Research
 Kaviyude Kalathanthram

Articles
 Vazhipadum Puthuvazhiyum

Awards
 2000: P. Kunhiraman Nair Award — Maravi Ezhuthunnathu
 2002: Abu Dhabi Sakthi Award (Poetry)
 2013: Ulloor Award — Carol
 2014: Kerala Sahitya Akademi Award for Overall Contributions
 2018: Asan Smaraka Kavitha Puraskaram
 2019: Abu Dhabi Sakthi Award (Poetry) — Enne Kandumuttanenikkavumo

References

Living people
Malayali people
People from Thrissur district
Indian male poets
Malayalam-language writers
Malayalam poets
20th-century Indian poets
21st-century Indian poets
1948 births
Recipients of the Abu Dhabi Sakthi Award
Recipients of the Kerala Sahitya Akademi Award